"Ella No Es Tuya" is a song by Dominican rapper Rochy RD. It was released on July 8, 2020 through Vulcano Music Entertainment, the song obtained a gold record in the United States certified by the RIAA in the Latin category for more than 30,000 units. In February 2021 its remix version was released which had a great impact. The music video for the song has more than 40 million views on YouTube.

Myke Towers and Nicki Nicole remix

"Ella No Es Tuya (Remix)" is the remix version of the song "Ella No Es Tuya" by the Dominican singer Rochy RD, this time with Puerto Rican rapper and singer Myke Towers and the Argentine rapper Nicki Nicole. It was released on February 3, 2021 through Sony Music Latin. The song was one of the most viral of 2021 and it became top 1 in Spain and Argentina. The music video for the song has more than 140 million views on YouTube.

Charts

Certifications

References

External links
 Lyric of song at Genius

2020 songs
2020 singles
Nicki Nicole songs
Sony Music Latin singles
Number-one singles in Spain
Songs written by Nicki Nicole